Untouchable is a 2017 South Korean television series starring Jin Goo, Kim Sung-kyun, Jung Eun-ji and Go Joon-hee. It aired from November 24, 2017 to January 20, 2018 on JTBC's Fridays and Saturdays at 23:00 (KST) time slot for 16 episodes.

Synopsis
Untouchable is the story of power games and hidden secrets of the Jang family who has ruled the city of Bukcheon for three generations.

Cast

Main
 Jin Goo as Jang Joon-seo, a detective squad chief and the second son of Jang clan who chases after the truth behind the death of his wife.
 Kim Sung-kyun as Jang Ki-seo, Joon-seo's older brother who turns corrupt like his father in order to survive.
 Jung Eun-ji as Seo Yi-ra, a prosecutor.
 Go Joon-hee as Goo Ja-kyung, Ki-seo's wife who is the only daughter of a former president.

Supporting

Jang family
 Park Geun-hyung as Jang Beom-ho
 Choi Jong-won as Goo Yong-chan
  as Jang Beom-sik
  as Jang Gyu-ho
 Shin Jung-geun as Yong Hak-soo
 Ye Soo-jung as Park Young-sook

Police department
 Jin Kyung as Jung Yoon-mi
 Park Won-sang as Go Soo-chang
  as Choi Jae-ho
  as Lee Sung-kyun
 Park Ji-hwan as Goo Do-su

Others
 Kyung Soo-jin as Yoon Jung-hye
 Ji Yoon-ha as Yoo Na-na
  as Jo Taek-sang
  as Joo Tae-seob

Production
 The series is set in a fictional city called Bukcheon.
 The first script reading of the cast was held on August 17, 2017 at JTBC building in Sangam-dong.

Viewership

Notes

References

External links
  
 
 

Korean-language television shows
JTBC television dramas
2017 South Korean television series debuts
2018 South Korean television series endings
South Korean action television series
South Korean thriller television series
South Korean mystery television series
South Korean melodrama television series
Television series by Kim Jong-hak Production
Television series by Drama House